Wiesław Ochman (born 6 February 1937) is a Polish tenor.

Life and career 
In 1960, he graduated from the AGH University of Science and Technology in Kraków. Ochman began learning voice under the direction of Gustaw Serafin in Kraków (1955–1959) and Maria Szłapak in Bytom (1960–1963). In 1960, he joined the Silesian Opera in Bytom, where he sang for three seasons, in 1963 and 1964; and then, at the Opera Krakowska. He performed at the Teatr Wielki in Warsaw from 1964 till 1970. In 1965 he sang the tenor lead Jontek in the "national Polish opera" Halka by Stanisław Moniuszko in the opening performance in the reconstructed Teatr Wielki. He recorded that role and it is now available on compact disc.

Wiesław Ochman began his international career in 1967 with the Berlin State Opera. He sang in Munich and Hamburg. He achieved his first successes in competition at festivals in Glyndebourne and Salzburg. In 1972, he was engaged by the Paris Opera, and consecutively by operas in Chicago and San Francisco. He also performed in Milan's La Scala, Buenos Aires, Madrid, Moscow and Vienna. In 1975 with the role of Arrigo in the opera The Sicilian Vespers by Giuseppe Verdi, Ochman made his debut at New York's  Metropolitan Opera.

Wiesław Ochman recorded 31 vinyl records, most of them in Poland.

In 1980, he was awarded the City of Kraków Award and in 1996 he received the Order of the Smile. In 2001, he was awarded by then President of Poland Aleksander Kwaśniewski the Commander's Cross with Star of the Order of Polonia Restituta for his outstanding achievements in the field of culture. In 2005, he became a recipient of the Gold Medal for Merit to Culture – Gloria Artis.

Personal life

He married his wife, Krystyna, in 1963. He is the grandfather of singer Krystian Ochman, the winner of the eleventh season of The Voice of Poland and the winner of Poland's national selection to represent the country at the Eurovision Song Contest 2022.

Discography
SX 0465 Wiesław Ochman Best Loved Operatic Arias
Giacomo Puccini: La bohème, Rodolfo's aria from Act I Che gelida manina
Giacomo Puccini: Tosca, Cavaradossi's aria from Act III E lucevan le stelle
Giuseppe Verdi: Aida, Radames's aria from Act I Se quel guerrier io fossi!... Celeste Aida
Pyotr Ilyich Tchaikovsky: Eugene Onegin, Lensky's aria from Act II Kuda, kuda
Giacomo Puccini: Turandot, Calaf's aria from Act III Nessun dorma
Władysław Żeleński: Janek, Janek's aria Gdy ślub weźmiesz z twoim Stachem
Friedrich von Flotow: Martha, Lyonel's aria from Act III M’appari
Georges Bizet: Les pêcheurs de perles, Nadir's aria from Act I Je crois entendre encore
Georges Bizet: Carmen, Don Jose's aria from Act II La fleur que tu m’avais jeteee
Giuseppe Verdi: Rigoletto, Duke's aria from Act III La donna è mobile
SX 0972 Wiesław Ochman Polskie Arie Operowe
Stanisław Moniuszko: Halka, Dumka Jontka from Act IV Szumią Jodły
Stanisław Moniuszko: The Haunted Manor, Stefan's aria from Act III Cisza dokoła
Stanisław Moniuszko: Flis, Franek's aria Płyną tratwy po Wiśle
Feliks Nowowiejski: Legenda Bałtyku, Doman's aria from Act II Więc ty mnie nie kochasz
Ignacy Jan Paderewski: Manru, Manru's aria from Act II Jako gdy wśród skwaru
Roman Statkowski: Maria, Wacław's aria from Act I Och jak ciąży ta wesołość
Władysław Żeleński: Goplana, Kirkor's aria from Act I Za jaskółeczką ciągną moje oczy
Władysław Żeleński: Janek, Janek's aria Gdy ślub weźmiesz z twoim Stachem
SX 1281 Wiesław Ochman Słynne arie operetkowe
SX 1371 Wiesław Ochman Sławni polscy śpiewacy vol. 7
Wolfgang Amadeus Mozart: Don Giovanni, Don Ottavio's aria from Act II Il mio tesoro
Giacomo Puccini: Tosca, Cavaradossi's aria from Act I Recondita armonia
Amilcare Ponchielli: La Gioconda, Enzo's aria from Act II Cielo e mar!
Pietro Mascagni: Cavalleria rusticana, Turiddu's aria Mamma, quel vino e generoso
Giacomo Puccini: Manon Lescaut, Des Grieux's aria from Act I Donna non vidi mai
Umberto Giordano: Fedora, Loris's aria from Act II Amor ti vieta
Giacomo Puccini: La boheme, Rodolfo's aria from Act I Che gelida manina
Umberto Giordano: Andrea Chénier, Chenier's improvisation from Act I Un di all’azzurro spazio
Ruggero Leoncavallo: Pagliacci, Canio's aria from Act I Vesti la giubba
Giacomo Puccini: Madama Butterfly, Pinkerton's aria from Act III Addio, fiorito asil
Gaetano Donizetti: L'elisir d'amore, Nemorino's aria from Act II Una furtiva lagrima

See also
Music of Poland

References

External links
Interview with Wiesław Ochman by Bruce Duffie, October 10, 1980

1937 births
Living people
Musicians from Warsaw
Polish operatic tenors
AGH University of Science and Technology alumni
Recipients of the Order of Polonia Restituta
Recipients of the Gold Medal for Merit to Culture – Gloria Artis
20th-century Polish male opera singers